Musica Transalpina is a collection of madrigals published in England in 1588.  The madrigals had crossed the Alps (hence the name) in the sense that the madrigal form was borrowed from the Italians, and the pieces were mainly by Italians (although the lyrics were rendered into English). It is significant for marking the beginning of the golden age of the madrigal in England.

Musica transalpina contains 57 separate pieces by 18 composers, with Alfonso Ferrabosco the elder having the most, and Luca Marenzio second most.  Ferrabosco had lived in England in the 1560s and 1570s, which could explain the large number of his compositions in the book; he was relatively unknown in Italy.

Publication history
The collection appeared with a dedication to Gilbert Talbot. It was edited by Nicholas Yonge and printed by Thomas East. Several similar anthologies followed immediately after the success of the first. For example, in 1590 East published The First Set of Italian Madrigals; the compositions (which were mainly by Marenzio) were provided with English texts by the poet Thomas Watson. 
Yonge himself published a second Musica transalpina in 1597, hoping to duplicate the success of the first collection.

See also
Musica Transalpina is also the title of a 2006 collection of poetry by Michelene Wandor.

References

External links

1588 works
Madrigals
Music books